Garageland are a New Zealand indie rock band on the Flying Nun record label formed in Auckland in 1992. Influenced by Pixies, Pavement, The Clean and The Velvet Underground, they were critically acclaimed in the UK and United States for their well-crafted and catchy pop songs. The band took its name from "Garageland", a song by The Clash. Their non-album single "Feel Alright" from 1998 included former The Velvet Underground member John Cale on piano.

They re-formed for a one-off gig in Auckland in November 2007 and to play The Others Way festival in September 2015

Band members

Current
 Jeremy Eade – vocal, guitar
 Dave Goodison – guitar
 Mark Silvey – bass guitar
 Andrew Gladstone – backing vocalist, drums

Past
 Debbie Silvey – guitar, on early recordings including "Last Exit to Garageland"
 Andrew Claridge – guitar

Discography

Albums

Featured appearances
The group have appeared on several compilations over the years in New Zealand and overseas.  The following is a list of these albums that have featured tracks by Garageland.

Singles

References

External links
[ AMG entry]
Garageland official site

Dunedin Sound musical groups
Flying Nun Records artists
New Zealand indie rock groups
Musical groups established in 1992
Musical groups disestablished in 2002
Musical groups reestablished in 2007